San Simeone may refer to
San Simeone Piccolo, the Church of San Simeone Piccolo in Santa Croce, Venice, northern Italy
San Simeone Profeta, the Church of San Simeone Grande in  Santa Croce, Venice, northern Italy